The Masters France (sponsored by BNP Paribas) was a professional tennis exhibition round-robin singles-only tournament, played on indoor hard courts, specifically Plexicushion. It was held in December at the Palais des Sports de Toulouse in Toulouse, France, in 2008 and 2009. The eight players qualified for the event were the top seven French players, based on their performance in the four Association of Tennis Professionals (ATP) tournaments held in France, the Marseille Open 13, the Metz Open de Moselle, the Grand Prix de Tennis de Lyon, and the Paris BNP Paribas Masters, and an eighth French player receiving a wild card.

History

Creation

In February 2008, during the 2008 Open 13 in Marseille, three former professional French tennis players, Jean-François Caujolle, Gilles Moretton and Jean-Louis Haillet announced the creation on their impulse, and with the participation of the French Tennis Federation (Fédération Française de Tennis – FFT) of a special year-end event for French tennis players, intended to reinforce competition in the four existing French ATP events on the tour, recreate an event similar to the defunct French National Singles Championships, and bring back a large tennis event in Toulouse after the discontinuation of the Grand Prix de Tennis de Toulouse in 2000. The Masters France was conceived as a round robin tournament with prize money of 280,000€, with two groups of four players, to determine the finalists, matches played in two sets and a match tie-break, and including the seven players having won the most ATP points in the four French ATP events of Marseille, Metz, Lyon and Paris, and an additional wild card. The event, first planned to be played in November, right after the BNP Paribas Masters, was moved to late December, and the surface of choice was changed from a fast indoor hard court to a slower Plexicushion court, to transform the event into a warm-up tournament for the following year's Australian Open.

First event

The first Masters France was scheduled to be played from December 18 through December 21, with Jo-Wilfried Tsonga, Paul-Henri Mathieu, Gilles Simon, Julien Benneteau, Adrian Mannarino, Nicolas Mahut, Marc Gicquel and Richard Gasquet as the wild card. Tsonga decided to withdraw on December 2, explaining he wanted to delay his return to competition, and set up his own preparation at the end of December for the 2009 Australian Open, and was replaced by Michaël Llodra. Gasquet also withdrew on December 9, due to a lack of preparation after being sidelined for several weeks due to injury, and was replaced by Arnaud Clément. Mahut eventually pulled out on December 16, two days before the event, and was replaced by Lyon quarterfinalist and Rennes Challenger winner Josselin Ouanna.

Gicquel, Ouanna, Clément and Mannarino were eventually eliminated in the round robin stage of the event, with Julien Benneteau and Paul-Henri Mathieu qualifying for the third place match, and Gilles Simon and Michaël Llodra for the final. The third place match was dominated by Mathieu until 7–5, 4–4, when Benneteau managed to break back, and kept his momentum to win the match tie-break, and clinch the tournament's third place, on the score of 5–7, 6–4, 10–4. The final saw Simon took the early advantage, as the Tennis Masters Cup semifinalist broke Llodra twice to lead 5–1, before the Adelaide and Rotterdam titlist lined up 6 straight games to win the set 7–5. Both players broke each other repeatedly in the second set, until the tie-break, where Simon saved two match points for Llodra, and snatched the set 7–6(7). Already diminished by an arm strain, Llodra decided to retire, allowing the World No. 7, winner of Casablanca, Indianapolis and Bucharest during the season, to become the first champion of the Masters France.

Past finals

References

External links

Masters France official website
French Tennis Federation official website

 
Tennis tournaments in France
Exhibition tennis tournaments
Hard court tennis tournaments
Recurring sporting events established in 2008
Recurring events disestablished in 2009